Searls is a surname. Notable people with the surname include:

Damion Searls, American writer and translator
Dane Searls (1988–2011), Australian BMX rider
Doc Searls (born 1947), blogger on Linux
Fanny Searls (1851–1939), American doctor and botanical collector, after whom Searls’ prairie clover Dalea searlsiae is named
Hank Searls (born 1922), American writer and screenwriter
Niles Searls (1825–1907), American judge

See also
Searles (disambiguation)
Searl
Serles
Searle (disambiguation)